The R570 road is a regional road in County Kerry, Ireland. It travels from the N22 road at Glenflesk to the N72 at Barraduff, via the village of Headfort.

References

Regional roads in the Republic of Ireland
Roads in County Kerry